Lippomanus is a genus of seed bugs in the subfamily Anthocorinae (tribe Almeidini), erected by William Lucas Distant 1904.

Species
BioLib lists:
 Lippomanus brevicornis Yamada & Hirowatari, 2004
 Lippomanus hirsutus Distant, 1904 = type species

References

External links
 

Anthocoridae